99 Percent is an American hip hop duo from the Bay Area that consists of Cameron "Camo" Schauer and Johnnie "JayB" Jacob Jr. The duo gained their initial notoriety by from their 2013 single "Yike in It". In 2014, they released "iTwerk (She Twerk)". In July 2015, they released the single "Does Ya Mama Know (Dance Like That)", which has collected over 3 million views on YouTube.

In conjunction with Live Nation, 99 Percent was on the Let’s Dance 2016 U.S. Tour headlining with Silentó, iLoveMemphis, DLOW, and We are Toonz.

References

American hip hop groups
Hip hop duos
Musical groups from San Francisco